Prowler may refer to:

 "Prowler", a song by Iron Maiden from Iron Maiden, 1980
 Prowler (Marvel Comics), a Marvel Comics superhero
 The Prowler (1951 film), a film starring Van Heflin
 "The Prowler" (Australian Playhouse), an episode of the Australian anthology TV series Australian Playhouse
 The Prowler (1981 film), a film starring Laurence Tierney and Farley Granger
 Prowler (roller coaster), a wooden roller coaster at Worlds of Fun
 Prowler (Farscape), a type of spacecraft in Farscape
 Plymouth Prowler, an automobile
 Concept Prowler, an ultralight aircraft
 Northrop Grumman EA-6B Prowler, an electronic warfare aircraft
 PROWLER (Programmable Robot Observer With Logical Enemy Response), a 1980s experimental sentry robot
 Prowler, a member of the Predator monster truck team
 Prowler (satellite), an American reconnaissance satellite

See also

 Night Prowler (disambiguation)
 Stalker (disambiguation)